Childwold Memorial Presbyterian Church is a historic Presbyterian church located at Piercefield in St. Lawrence County, New York. It was built in 1893 and is a small, rectangular one story Queen Anne adaptation, approximately 25 feet wide and 42 feet long.

It was listed on the National Register of Historic Places in 2001.

References

Churches on the National Register of Historic Places in New York (state)
Presbyterian churches in New York (state)
Queen Anne architecture in New York (state)
Churches completed in 1903
20th-century Presbyterian church buildings in the United States
Churches in St. Lawrence County, New York
National Register of Historic Places in St. Lawrence County, New York
1903 establishments in New York (state)